The 1991–92 Cypriot Third Division was the 21st season of the Cypriot third-level football league. PAEEK FC won their 1st title.

Format
Fourteen teams participated in the 1991–92 Cypriot Third Division. All teams played against each other twice, once at their home and once away. The team with the most points at the end of the season crowned champions. The first two teams were promoted to 1992–93 Cypriot Second Division. The last three teams were relegated to the 1992–93 Cypriot Fourth Division.

The 3rd-placed team faced the 12th-placed team of the 1992–93 Cypriot Second Division, in a two-legged relegation play-off for one spot in the 1992–93 Cypriot Second Division.

Point system
Teams received three points for a win, one point for a draw and zero points for a loss.

League standings

Promotion playoff 
Adonis Idaliou faced Ethnikos Assia FC. Ethnikos Assia FC won the playoffs.

Sources

See also
 Cypriot Third Division
 1991–92 Cypriot First Division
 1991–92 Cypriot Cup

Cypriot Third Division seasons
Cyprus
1991–92 in Cypriot football